Juntos Para Siempre is the debut studio album released by Los Mismos on September 17, 1996 under EMI Latin after Marco Antonio Solís left Los Bukis to pursue a solo career in 1995. It received a nomination for Regional Mexican Album of the Year at Premio Lo Nuestro 1997.

Track listing

References

1996 debut albums
Spanish-language albums
Los Mismos albums